Ruvheneko Elsie Parirenyatwa (born 15 September 1988) is a Zimbabwean radio and television talk show host, emcee, voice-over artist, brand ambassador and philanthropist. She is a talk show host for Ruvheneko, a current affairs talk show that airs on YouTube as well as on radio for Zimbabwe's Capitalk 100.4 FM and Star FM.

She was ranked second on the 2017 list of most influential Zimbabweans Under 40 compiled by a UK-based business magazine.

Early life
Ruvheneko Parirenyatwa was born on 15 September 1988. She is the daughter of politician and physician David Parirenyatwa and Choice Parirenyatwa. She is also the granddaughter of Tichafa Samuel Parirenyatwa, the first black medical doctor in Southern Rhodesia and for whom the Parirenyatwa Hospital is named.

Parirenyatwa attended Chisipite Senior School from 2001 to 2006. She initially wanted to be a pediatrician because her father is a doctor, but decided against it after failing her O Levels in biology. She entered the University of Cape Town as a law student, but switched to a media degree program after taking a media elective her second year. She graduated with a Bachelor of Arts in media and writing and political science in 2009. She went on to earn a postgraduate diploma in marketing at the same university.

Broadcasting career
Parirenyatwa launched her broadcasting career whilst she was a student at the University of Cape Town (UCT). She joined the university's radio station when she was in her second year as the current affairs talk show host.

In November 2013, she was nominated to participate in the Africa Leadership Project that was launched in 2014. She has emceed at the former First Lady Grace Mugabe's 50th birthday as well the former First Daughter Bona and Simba Chikore's wedding. Parirenyatwa is the presenter of The Zimbabwe Election Debates Series with Election Resource Centre Zimbabwe broadcast on Star FM and Capitalk100.4FM and has since interviewed politicians on her talk shows.  Additionally, Ruvheneko is a Radio Division Projects Manager at Zimpapers and is also studying a Master of Science in International Relations at the University of Zimbabwe.

ZiFM Stereo
Parirenyatwa was the radio presenter and producer for current affairs at a radio station in Harare called ZiFM Stereo from 2012 until 2016. In 2015 until 2016, she also took on the role as programming manager.

Parirenyatwa explained that she wanted a free space hence her resignation from the radio station. In an online television platform, she stated that she was more enthusiastic about uncompromised dialogue. She explained how stipulations as a result of editorial policy hindered open dialogue which for her was destructive because she wanted to continue the dialogue she created without fear or subjugation. She has since started her online TV show which airs on Facebook Live along with her talk shows on Capitalk 100.4 FM and Star FM Zimbabwe.

Philanthropy
Parirenyatwa was the deputy chairperson of the Harare Youth Council, an organisation that advances the opportunities for youth in Zimbabwe. Together with a group of friends, she launched the ZimboLove Foundation in 2013; a charity that helps people who cannot afford blood by giving them

The Ruvheneko Mentorship Program is aimed at young ambitious Zimbabweans. They work with youths on their journey to success by finding where their purpose and passion intersect. This program develops skills, strategies and capabilities and in turn brings out the greatness and uniqueness from every individual mentee. It also molds the mentee's character and personality to find favour in all endeavours.

Awards
Parirenyatwa has been awarded many accolades including but not limited to:
 Women's Top Business Leader of the Year – Special Recognition in Media and Broadcasting Excellence from Women's Leadership Awards (2017)
 Top Outstanding Woman in Broadcast Media & Radio in Republic of Zimbabwe from Women's Heritage Society World Organization (WHSWO) (2015) 
 Top 20 outstanding woman in Business for the year 2015 special recognition in good media relations from the Megafest business awards,
 Radio personality of the year (Zimbabwe Business awards 2014)

Personal life
In 2014, Parirenyatwa married Tendai Mafara. In 2021, the couple divorced and announced they had in fact separated in 2016. In March 2022, Parirenyatwa announced she was pregnant with her first child.

References

Further reading 

WikiGap Harare
1988 births
Living people
University of Cape Town alumni
Alumni of Chisipite Senior School
Zimbabwean philanthropists
Zimbabwean radio presenters
Zimbabwean women radio presenters
Zimbabwean television presenters
Zimbabwean women television presenters